Federica Haumüller (born 5 December 1972) is a former professional tennis player from Argentina who played between 1987 and 1991.

Haumüller won one WTA tournament.

Career finals

Singles (1 title)

ITF finals

Singles (0–2)

Doubles (3–0)

Ranking history

Year end – singles:

1991: 336

1990: 132

1989: 207

1988: 380

References

 This article is based on a translation of articles from the French and Spanish Wikipedia.

External links
 
 

1972 births
Living people
Argentine female tennis players
Argentine people of German descent
People from Caseros Department
Sportspeople from Santa Fe Province
20th-century Argentine women